Brewarrina Airport  is a small airport located  west southwest of Brewarrina, New South Wales, Australia.

See also
List of airports in New South Wales

References

Airports in New South Wales